eRoom is an on-line project collaboration, or collaborative software product from Opentext Corporation. Originally developed by eRoom Technology Inc., of Cambridge, Massachusetts, product features include e-mail management, calendaring, instant messaging, project plans, databases, and document management.

The company, first called Instinctive Technology, was founded in 1996 by a group predominantly from Lotus Development Corporation (which had been acquired by IBM Corporation in 1995), and was led by CEO Jeffrey Beir.

One of eRoom's first clients was Hewlett-Packard, which became one of the first clients to use eRoom's hosted service, in which the eRoom software was run on its own servers rather than the customers' servers, for a monthly fee. 

In December, 2002, (announced in October) Documentum acquired eRoom Technology in a cash-and-stock transaction valued at more than $100 million.  After Documentum bought eRoom Technology, Inc., they began integrating the eRoom product with their Content management platform, Documentum 5.  The first integrated release, eRoom Enterprise, was released in February, 2003. Version 7 of eRoom, which was released later that year, added a library of horizontal applications for audit management, deal management, customer management and project management.

In October, 2003, almost a year after the eRoom acquisition, Documentum, Inc, was purchased by EMC2.

On October 12, 2015, Dell Inc. announced that it would acquire EMC in a cash-and-stock deal valued at $67 billion—the largest-ever acquisition in the technology industry. The merger closed on September 7, 2016. EMC has been renamed to Dell EMC as a result of the merger.

On September 12, 2016, OpenText, acquired Dell EMC's ECD division—which included Documentum, and eRoom—for $1.6B USD.

See also 
 List of collaborative software

Notes

External links 
 eRoom Picks Up Steam
 Lotus, eRoom duke it out over collaboration apps
 Will the digital office take off for grounded corps?
 eRoom Technology launches eRoom 5.0
 eRoom Technology Delivers Major Update to eRoom.net Hosted Digital Workplace
 eRoom Technology Introduces Next Generation Digital Workplace with Unveiling of eRoom Version 6.0
 Ford Motor Company Globally Deploys eRoom Technology's Digital Workplace for Collaborative eBusiness Initiatives
 Courting Trial Technology
 Easy Enterprise Collaboration 
 Documentum Acquires eRoom, Says Earnings On Target
 eRoom New version of eRooms announced at well-attended Documentum conference
 EMC Documentum eRoom
 eRoom to Office 365 Migration
 About eRoom, on Knowledge Management Community

Proprietary software
Collaborative software